Delamar Valley is one of the central Nevada desert basins and the southern portion of the Dry Lake Watershed, including a low point on the serpentine section of the Great Basin Divide in Nevada.

References 

Valleys of Nevada
Valleys of Lincoln County, Nevada